Broome International Airport  is a regional airport located  west of the Broome GPO, Western Australia.

Broome International Airport is the regional hub of the northwestern part of Western Australia. It is considered the gateway to the Kimberley region. In the year ending 30 June 2011 the airport handled 409,663 passengers. It is ranked the 20th busiest airport in Australia.

History
World War II 
The airport field was attacked on the morning of 3 March 1942, during World War II. The attack on Broome resulted in at least 88 deaths. The airport field was being used by the Royal Australian Air Force (RAAF) and allies, the Japanese raid destroyed at least 22 aircraft, parts of which are still on display to this day at Broome Historical Museum.

Postwar
The airport runway was extended in around 2004–2006. It also has had several upgrades to helicopter infrastructure. It is home to state-of-the-art firefighting equipment.

The airport entry road, Macpherson Road, is named after the man who helped pioneer the town. The road was purpose built for the cable that ran from 200 meters east of vine walking trail at a junction box now enclosed in private property to Broome Court House, formerly Cable House.

From 18 November 2010 Broome International became a Class D non-radar controlled aerodrome which means that aircraft are separated by air traffic controllers based on estimates provided by pilots and reporting their distances and altitudes from the airfield.

The Kimberly Qantas lounge was upgraded in 2014–2015 when the terminal had landscaping and maintenance work carried out.

SilkAir operated four charter flights to Broome from Singapore; the first flight began on 22 May 2018 and the last flight operated on 2 June 2018. This was repeated in 2019.

A Qantas A330 landed in Broome on 14 May 2019 after an electronics failure on QF44 DPS-SYD, making it the largest aircraft to ever land there.

Airlines and destinations

Operations

Accidents and incidents
On 21 January 1974, Douglas C-47A PK-GDC of the Burmah Oil Co was damaged beyond economic repair in an accident.
On 11 July 2012, a Piper PA-34 Seneca of Golden Eagle Airlines crashed into sand dunes near the runway threshold. The aircraft, registration VH-LCK was operating a scheduled cargo flight to Port Hedland in good weather conditions at night. The pilot was the sole occupant. He was killed in the accident. Investigations by the Australian Transport Safety Bureau into the cause of the accident found that the collision was due to a likely loss of engine power.

See also
 Attack on Broome
 Broome Seaplane Base
 Australian Overland Telegraph Line
 List of airports in Western Australia
 Aviation transport in Australia
 Submarine communications cable

References

External links
 Airservices Aerodromes & Procedure Charts

Kimberley airports
Buildings and structures in Broome, Western Australia
International airports in Australia